"Get Down" is the debut single by Canadian boy band b4-4. It was released in May 2000 as the first single from their debut self-titled album. The song was very successful in Canada, peaking at number 4 on Canada's Singles Chart. The song was written and produced by Jason Levine and James McCollum, who were nominated for "Best Producer" at the 2001 Juno Awards for their work on the track. The song was featured on MuchDance 2001.

Content
Since its release, the song has become infamous for its suggestive lyrics, which are thinly veiled references to oral sex. Ed the Sock, a MuchMusic denizen, castigated the song as a "sugar-coated fellatio fest".

Ryan and Dan Kowarsky later admitted the song was about oral sex.

Music video
The music video begins with a young boy walking and seeing a homeless man on the street, who asks for money. The boy has no money and continues walking until he stumbles upon a View-Master stereoscope left in the garbage. After looking through the lens of the stereoscope, he gains popularity and wealth as b4-4 dance and sing. At the end, he gives the stereoscope to the homeless man.

The song and its music video was mocked by Ed the Sock in his Fromage 2000 MuchMusic special.

Charts

References

B4-4 songs
Arista Records singles
2000 debut singles
2000 songs
Internet memes
Songs written by Jason Levine
Canadian pop songs
Songs written by James Bryan McCollum